Suriname competed with one person at the 1968 Summer Olympics in Mexico City, Mexico. Suriname returned to the Olympic Games after missing the 1964 Summer Olympics in Tokyo.

Athletics

Men

References
Official Olympic Reports
Part Three: Results

Nations at the 1968 Summer Olympics
1968
Olym